Alexander Warren (1795 – 3 July 1876) was a Scottish-born Australian politician.

He was born in Glasgow to merchant William Warren and Jean Jarvie. He migrated to New South Wales in 1824, working as an agent for a mercantile firm based in Edinburgh. He acquired land on the Williams River, where he had vineyards. From 1856 to 1858 he was a member of the New South Wales Legislative Council. Warren died in 1876.

References

1795 births
1876 deaths
Members of the New South Wales Legislative Council
19th-century Australian politicians